Kopanki  is a village in the administrative district of Gmina Opalenica, within Nowy Tomyśl County, Greater Poland Voivodeship, in west-central Poland.

The village has a population of 388.

References

Kopanki